Steven James Hislop (born 14 June 1978) is a Scottish former footballer and current assistant manager of Tranent Juniors. He played in the Scottish Premier League for Inverness Caledonian Thistle and Livingston.

Career

Playing
Hislop began his professional career with East Stirlingshire at the age of 22 before moving to full-time football with Ross County a year later. A move to Inverness Caledonian Thistle in early 2003 saw Hislop win the Scottish Challenge Cup and the Scottish Football League First Division title. He had a short spell in England with Gillingham before returning to Scotland with Livingston in January 2006.

Hislop went on to play for Raith Rovers where he won a Scottish Football League Second Division title before turning part-time with Arbroath and East Fife while opening in business as an optician.

Hislop joined Junior club Bo'ness United in June 2012 and moved on to Bonnyrigg Rose Athletic in the summer of 2014 where he assumed a player/coach role.

In 2013, he represented the Scotland Junior International Team at the Junior International Quadrangular Tournament scoring a hat trick in 6–0 against The Isle of Man.

Coaching
After retiring from football, Hislop took up the role of assistant manager at Arbroath, working alongside Todd Lumsden. On 31 March 2016, Hislop became manager of Whitehill Welfare in the Lowland Football League, however, in November 2016, after just seven months with the club, Hislop resigned from his position as manager to take up the role of assistant manager to Todd Lumsden at Linlithgow Rose. Hislop and manager Lumsden were fired on 2 May 2017.

On 1 September 2022, Hislop was appointed assistant manager of Colin Nish at Tranent Juniors.

References

External links
 
 

1978 births
Living people
Footballers from Edinburgh
Scottish footballers
East Stirlingshire F.C. players
Ross County F.C. players
Inverness Caledonian Thistle F.C. players
Livingston F.C. players
Gillingham F.C. players
Raith Rovers F.C. players
Arbroath F.C. players
East Fife F.C. players
Bo'ness United F.C. players
Bonnyrigg Rose Athletic F.C. players
English Football League players
Scottish Football League players
Scottish Junior Football Association players
Association football forwards
British opticians
Scotland junior international footballers